Federico Albert National Reserve is a  national reserve of Cauquenes Province, Chile, located near Chanco town.

This reserve consists in a plantation of trees as pines, eucalyptus, firs and many others, directed by the naturalist Frederich Albert Taupp (known in Spanish as Federico Albert), which made this for saving the town of Chanco of the dunes that growing along the coast.

References

National reserves of Chile
Protected areas of Maule Region
Coasts of Maule Region